Manglot National Park or Manglot Wildlife Park is national park established in 1990 in Khyber Pakhtunkhwa, Pakistan; the park is provide a natural sanctuary for wildlife. The area of the park is spread over on 1,756 acres including hilltops and plain area near the Indus River in Nizampur, Nowshera.

Flora
The flora of the Manglot Wildlife Park include scrub forest primarily consisting of the olive trees. Acacia modesta, zizyphus nummelaria, olea cuspidate, deodonia viscose and monothica boxifolia are the predominant vegetation of the park.

Fauna

Animals
The animals includes the chinkara, hog deer, common leopard, wolf, wild boar, jackal, porcupine and hare.

Reptiles
Including different sort of snakes and wild lizards are present in the park.

Birds
Including chukar, three varieties of partridges, rock pigeon, dove and several sparrows from different species.

References

External links
Wildlife Park at World Database on Protected Areas

National parks of Pakistan
Nowshera District
Protected areas of Khyber Pakhtunkhwa
Protected areas established in 1990